Samuel Anthony Boulmetis Sr. (February 17, 1927 - May 30, 2021) was an American thoroughbred horse racing jockey who was inducted into the National Museum of Racing and Hall of Fame in 1973. The Hall's induction biography says that "His peers described him as an honest and intelligent rider, qualities he later demonstrated as a racing official and state steward for New Jersey."

Born in Baltimore, the son of a Greek tailor, Sam Boulmetis began his involvement in the horse racing industry as a stable hand at Laurel Park Racecourse in Laurel, Maryland. He began riding professionally in late 1948 and earned his first win in 1949 at Garden State Park then went on to win that year's riding championship at Monmouth Park Racetrack. He repeated as the leading jockey at Monmouth Park in 1953, 1955, and 1956.

The winner of numerous important races, Boulmetis won the Arlington Classic twice and the prestigious Washington, D.C. International Stakes and Canadian International Stakes, forerunners to the Breeders' Cup races which drew the best horses to the United States and Canada from around the world. For owner Cornelius Vanderbilt Whitney, he rode Fisherman in the 1956 Prix de l'Arc de Triomphe at Longchamp Racecourse in Paris, France. Among the other notable horses he rode was Hall of Fame inductee Tosmah with whom he won seven stakes races. In the 1955 Massachusetts Handicap, Boulmetis rode Helioscope to a track record time of 2:01 for 1¼ miles on dirt, unbroken as of 2008.

Throughout his career Sam Boulmetis raced primarily at tracks on the East Coast of the United States. He retired from riding after the 1966 season and in 1969 was appointed a steward at Monmouth Park Racetrack in Oceanport, New Jersey. He retired in 2004 from his duties as a racing official and state steward for the State of New Jersey.

His son, Sam Boulmetis Jr., followed in his footsteps, becoming a professional jockey in 1973 and riding until 1981 when a racing accident left him paralyzed from the waist down. Sam Jr. is now a steward at Philadelphia Park Racetrack.

Sam Boulmetis' nephew is jockey Tony Black.

References

 Sam Boulmetis Sr. at the  United States National Museum of Racing and Hall of Fame
 Sports Illustrated October 15, 1956 article on Sam Boulmetis and the Prix de l'Arc de Triomphe
 May 31, 2004 Thoroughbred Times  article titled Edwards succeeds Boulmetis as steward at Monmouth
 

1927 births
2021 deaths
American jockeys
United States Thoroughbred Racing Hall of Fame inductees
Sportspeople from Baltimore
American people of Greek descent